Manouk is a masculine Armenian or female Dutch given name. Notable people with the name include:

Manouk Gijsman (born 1992), Dutch figure skater
Manouk Avedissian (1841–1925), more commonly known as Bechara Effendi or Bechara Effendi al-Muhandis, Ottoman Armenian administrator and the chief engineer of the Vilayet of Syria and later of the Vilayet of Beirut
Manouk Petrosian, birth name of Mkhitar Sebastatsi (1676–1749), Armenian Catholic monk, as well as prominent scholar and theologian who founded the Mekhitarist Order, which has been based on San Lazzaro island near Venice since 1717
Manouk Pluis (born 1983), Dutch actress

See also
Manuk (disambiguation)

Armenian masculine given names
Unisex given names